High Fives Foundation is a Lake Tahoe-based, national 501(c)(3) non-profit organization. Located in Truckee, California, the foundation provides grants for rehabilitation support to athletes with life-altering injuries as a result of mountain sports. It also promotes awareness of injury prevention. Athletes such as Nick Fairall and Julia Mancuso are involved with the foundation.

History
High Fives Foundation was founded in 2009 by Roy Tuscany. Tuscany suffered a spinal cord injury resulting in immediate lower body paralysis while skiing in 2006. In 2008, Tuscany hosted his first event called High Fives, which was a skiing contest for the best 540 rotation at the Sugar Bowl Resort. The event-based fundraising format became the primary revenue source. In August 2016, High Fives Foundation announced the Stowe Country Club in Vermont as the host for its second annual charity golf tournament.

Programs and initiatives
The foundation's Empowerment Fund provides grants to disabled winter action sports athletes and athletes recovering from life-altering injuries. The foundation expanded its mission to help people injured in summer mountain sports.

In 2011, the High Fives Foundation along with action sports professional J.T. Holmes created the BASICS Program Services (Being Aware Safe In Critical Situations). The program has produced five safety education documentaries, which are shown in schools, ski clubs, and to industry professionals around the country. Decorated freeskier Daron Rahlves is a program mentor.

The CR Johnson Healing Center is a 2,400 square foot training facility in Truckee, California, that provides resources for athletes in the process of rehabilitation such as physical therapy, acupuncture, active release techniques, and personal training.

High Fives Foundation created the Military to the Mountains program which enables United States military veterans injured during tour of duty to ski in Squaw Valley. In 2016, the foundation helped its 100th athlete with the Military to the Mountains program. In May 2016, High Fives Foundation received a $150,000 donation from Squaw Valley Alpine Meadows for its Military to the Mountains program.

Filmography

References

External links
High Fives Foundation official site
BASICS videos
Choices awareness video

Charities based in California
Lake Tahoe
Parasports organizations in the United States